Thomas Shaw (1823 - 15 January 1893) was an English Liberal politician who represented Halifax.

Shaw was born at Green Bank, Holywell Green, Yorkshire the third son of Joseph Shaw who owned the Brookroyd Mills. He was educated at Huddersfield and later became chairman of the family firm, John Shaw & Sons and was President of Halifax Mechanics' Institute. He was Mayor of Halifax from 1866 to 1868. In 1881, when his son came of age, he gave £1,000 to Halifax School Board to promote education in  Halifax, which was used to establish the  Rawson Shaw Scholarships . He was elected as M.P. for Halifax at a by-election in 1882. He held the seat until his death at the age of 69 in 1893. His son William Rawson Shaw was elected in succession to him.

Shaw married Elizabeth Rawson at Manchester in 1855 and had a son William Rawson.

External links 
 
 Malcolm Bull's Calderdale Companion

1823 births
1893 deaths
Liberal Party (UK) MPs for English constituencies
UK MPs 1880–1885
UK MPs 1885–1886
UK MPs 1886–1892
UK MPs 1892–1895